Franco Rossetti was an Italian film director  and screenwriter .

Life and career 
Born in Siena, Rossetti started his career as a film critic, then in the early 1950s he entered the film industry as an assistant director. With the rise of the Spaghetti Western genre, Rossetti developed a solid reputation as a screenwriter, especially thanks to the screenplays of Django, Texas, Adios and Johnny Oro. He made his directorial debut in 1967 with the western The Dirty Outlaws, and then he directed seven more films, spanning different genres.

Filmography 
 1967: The Dirty Outlaws  
 1969: Delitto al circolo del tennis
 1972: Una cavalla tutta nuda
 1974: Nipoti miei diletti
 1975: Quel movimento che mi piace tanto
 1978: Il mondo porno di due sorelle 
 1984: Il lebbroso  
 1984: Al limite, cioè, non glielo dico

References

External links 
 

1930 births
Italian film directors
Italian screenwriters
Italian male screenwriters
People from Siena
Living people